Vanadates can refer to:

 Ammonium vanadate (disambiguation)
 Sodium vanadate (disambiguation)